Lobogenesis penai is a species of moth of the family Tortricidae. It is found in Bolivia. The habitat consists of tropical cloud forests.

The length of the forewings is 6.8 mm. The forewings are pale cream with pale brown striae. The hindwings are white with grey-brown mottling.

Etymology
The species is named in honour of Chilean entomologist Louis Pena.

References

Moths described in 2000
Euliini